Jens Kruppa (born 3 June 1976 in Freital) is an international breaststroke swimmer from Germany, who won the silver medal in the 4×100 metres medley relay at the 2004 Summer Olympics.

See also
 List of German records in swimming

References

1976 births
Living people
German male swimmers
German male breaststroke swimmers
Male medley swimmers
Swimmers at the 2000 Summer Olympics
Swimmers at the 2004 Summer Olympics
Olympic swimmers of Germany
Olympic silver medalists for Germany
Olympic bronze medalists for Germany
Olympic bronze medalists in swimming
World Aquatics Championships medalists in swimming
Medalists at the FINA World Swimming Championships (25 m)
European Aquatics Championships medalists in swimming
Medalists at the 2004 Summer Olympics
Medalists at the 2000 Summer Olympics
Olympic silver medalists in swimming
Goodwill Games medalists in swimming
Competitors at the 1998 Goodwill Games
People from Freital
Sportspeople from Saxony